Caleb Murphy (born December 15, 1999) is an American football defensive end who currently plays for the Ferris State Bulldogs. He previously played for the Grand Valley State Lakers.

Early life and high school
Murphy grew up in Dowagiac, Michigan and attended Dowagiac Union High School, where he was a member of the football, basketball, wrestling, baseball, and track and field teams. He was named first team All-State as a junior after recording 86 tackles with 17 tackles for loss and 15 sacks. Murphy repeated as a first team All-State selection during his senior year after making 97 tackles with 27 tackles for loss and 13 sacks.

College career
Murphy began his college career at Grand Valley State and redshirted his true freshman season. He had 13 tackles and one sack in eight games in 2019.  Murphy transferred to Ferris State after his redshirt freshman year. His first season at Ferris State was cancelled due to Covid-19. Murphy was named the Great Lakes Intercollegiate Athletic Conference (GLIAC) Defensive Lineman of the Year and first team All-GLIAC after finishing the 2021 season with 63 tackles, 14.5 sacks, 21.5 tackles for loss, and five forced fumbles as the Bulldogs won the 2021 NCAA Division II Football Championship Game. 

As a senior, Murphy set an NCAA single-season record with 25.5 sacks and also tied the NCAA record with 39 tackles for loss while Ferris State repeated as national champions. At the end of the season, Murphy became the first non-FBS player to win the Ted Hendricks Award as the nation's best defensive end. He was also named the GLIAC Player of the Year and won the Gene Upshaw Award as the best lineman in NCAA Division II and the Cliff Harris Award as the nation's best small college defensive player.

References

External links
Grand Valley State Lakers bio
Ferris State Bulldogs bio

Living people
American football defensive ends
Players of American football from Michigan
Ferris State Bulldogs football players
Grand Valley State Lakers football players
Year of birth missing (living people)